João Tiago Serrão Garcês (born 7 March 1993 in Funchal, Madeira), commonly known as Jota, is a Portuguese professional footballer who plays for Nacional as a midfielder.

References

External links

1993 births
Living people
Sportspeople from Funchal
Portuguese footballers
Madeiran footballers
Association football midfielders
Primeira Liga players
Liga Portugal 2 players
C.D. Nacional players
C.F. União players
Atlético Clube de Portugal players
Leixões S.C. players
Portugal youth international footballers